The Radio Music Awards was an annual U.S. award show that honored the year's most successful songs on mainstream radio. Nominations were based on the amount of airplay recording artists receive on radio stations in various formats using chart information compiled by Mediabase.

Originally conceived as an award show vehicle for The WB in 1999, it was moved to ABC in 2000 and finally to NBC, which promoted it as the music industry's answer to the Golden Globes.

In past years, the show included many of the top names in music including NSYNC, Shakira, Backstreet Boys, Green Day, Janet Jackson, Mariah Carey, Train, Elton John, Destiny's Child, Tim McGraw, Kelly Clarkson, Lenny Kravitz, Nelly, Gavin DeGraw, Britney Spears, Avril Lavigne, Lifehouse, and Christina Aguilera, among others.

Dates, venues, and networks
 October 28,  1999: Mandalay Bay Resort & Casino, Las Vegas, Nevada: (The WB)
 November 4, 2000: Aladdin Casino & Resort, Las Vegas, Nevada: (ABC)
 October 26, 2001: Aladdin Casino & Resort, Las Vegas, Nevada: (ABC)
 October 27, 2003: Aladdin Casino & Resort, Las Vegas, Nevada: (NBC)
 October 25, 2004: Aladdin Casino & Resort, Las Vegas, Nevada: (NBC)
December 19, 2005: Aladdin Casino & Resort, Las Vegas, Nevada: (NBC)

Categories

Main
Best Female/ Top 40
Best Male/Top 40
Best Female/Top 40 Country
Best Male/Top 40 Country
 Artist of the Year/ Mainstream Hit Radio  
 Song of the Year/Mainstream Hit Radio
 Artist of the Year/Urban and Rhythmic Radio  
 Song of the Year/Urban and Rhythmic Radio  
 Artist of the Year/Alternative and Active Rock Radio  
 Song of the Year/Alternative and Active Rock Radio  
 Artist of the Year/Country Radio  
 Song of the Year/Country Radio  
 Artist of the Year/Rock Radio  
 Song of the Year/Rock Radio  
 Artist of the Year/Adult Hit Radio  
 Song of the Year/Adult Hit Radio  
 Legend Award

One-offs and discontinued
 Air Personality Of The Year (1999)
 Best Car Jam (1999)
 Best Hook-Up Song (1999)
 Artist Parents Just Don't Understand (1999)
 Most Requested Artist of the Year (2001)
 Most Requested Song of the Year (2001)
 Most Requested Party Song of the Year (2000)
 Humanitarian Award (Michael Jackson, 2003)
 Cingular Wireless Artist of the year (2004)

References

American music awards
Zappos Theater